E-comm can refer to:

 A common abbreviation for electronic commerce and a frequent choice for the name of many e-Commerce companies.
 E-Comm, the emergency communications agency for Southwest British Columbia.
 Emerging Communications Conference.